Rishi Puri is a two-time Indian National Sudoku Champion. He is considered to be one of the top three sudoku solvers from India along with Rohan Rao and Prasanna Seshadri at the national championships and the World Sudoku Championships. Rishi won the Indian Sudoku Championships in 2014 and 2015. He also won the Times Sudoku Championship in 2013.

Rishi has also won various international Sudoku competitions. He has been a runner-up twice at the Brand's international Sudoku Competition held in Bangkok, Thailand in 2011 and 2012. Rishi also won the Times UK National Sudoku Championship in 2012.

Rishi was the first Indian to qualify for the World Puzzle Federations' Sudoku Grand Prix by finishing in the top 10 across the world where he finished 9th, in 2014. In 2015 at Sofia, Bulgaria, Rishi improved his standing at the Grand Prix by finishing at a career-best rank of 7th. The 2015 World Sudoku Championship was also the last one attended by Rishi, post which he retired. He now has two children, Rudra Pratap Puri and Veer Pratap Puri, who also participated in the U-10 and U-8 categories, respectively, in Asia Sudoku Championship in 2019.

References 

Year of birth missing (living people)
Living people
Sudoku solvers